Subrata Mukherjee (14 June 1946 – 4 November 2021) was an Indian politician who was cabinet minister of the government of West Bengal and sitting member of West Bengal Legislative Assembly. He was a member of All India Trinamool Congress. He was also the 35th Mayor of Kolkata from 2000 to 2005.

Political career

Career with Indian National Congress
Mukherjee started his political career as a student activist during his higher education in Kolkata. He joined the Chhatra Parishad, a student organisation affiliated to the Indian National Congress, in the 1960s. During this period he made the acquaintance of Priya Ranjan Dasmunsi.

Mukherjee was considered one of the two close aides of former prime minister Indira Gandhi, along with Priya Ranjan Dasmunsi. CPIM leaders used a slogan "Indirar dui putra Priyo Ranjan o Subrata". 

In 1971 and 1972, Mukherjee was elected to the legislative assembly from the Ballygunge Assembly constituency. In 1972, he was appointed Minister of State in the Siddhartha Shankar Ray ministry as Minister of Information and Cultural Affairs. He also held an additional responsibility as Minister of State for local government. 

He lost the Ballygunge Assembly constituency when the Congress party was defeated by the Left Front amid huge anti-incumbency voting patterns. In 1982, he shifted to the Jorabagan Assembly constituency and represented it till 1996. He was elected to the Legislative Assembly from Chowranghee in 1996 and 2001.

Career with All India Trinamool Congress
In 1999, he joined with Mamata Banerjee, parting ways with the Indian National Congress. This decision came from the Congress MLA, as INTUC denied him the nomination to the governing body of the ILO for the second term. He was made the Mayor of Kolkata in 2000, as a Trinamool Congress candidate. However, even after being the Mayor as a Trinamool leader, he decided not to resign as a Congress member of the Legislative Assembly. As Mayor, he had planned a 300 ft-high Kolkata gate on EM Bypass, which would have cost Rs. 20-crore. However, the project could not go ahead, as it could not obtain clearance from the Pollution Control Board.

Mukherjee was also elected to the Assembly on a Trinamool Congress ticket in 2001 from Chowrighee. He also contested the Lok Sabha elections in 2004 from Calcutta North West constituency, but lost.

Polls of Kolkata Municipal Corporation
Ahead of the civic polls in 2005, Mukherjee quit Trinamool Congress following differences with the party chief, and joined the Nationalist Congress Party. He was able to cobble up an alliance with Congress and several marginal players under the platform of Paschimbanga Unnayan Mancha. Although he was able to get elected to the corporation, his front suffered a humiliating defeat.

Even after leaving Trinamool Congress, he did not resign as a Trinamool member in the legislative assembly until the end of its term in 2006.

Later career
In the 2006 state elections, he came third in the Chowranghee seat as a Congress candidate. In 2006, the Congress had also fielded Mukherjee for the biennial election for a Rajya Sabha seat, but he failed to win.

In 2009, he fought from Bankura Lok Sabha constituency on the Congress ticket and lost. 

In May 2010, Mukherjee left the Indian National Congress again and rejoined Trinamool Congress, leaving the post of Pradesh Congress Working President. He contested the 2011 Assembly elections from the Ballygunge seat.

Cabinet Minister

In 2011, after the Trinamool Congress won a majority in the West Bengal Legislative Assembly, he was made Minister for Public Health Engineering under Chief Minister Mamata Banerjee. In December 2011, he was given the additional charge of Panchayati Raj & Rural Development ministry, and replaced Chandranath Sinha.

In February 2012, he was made the All India President of the INTTUC, instead of Sobhandeb Chatterjee. In the 2019 Loksabha elections, he fought from Bankura and lost to Subhas Sarkar of the BJP. He won with huge margin in 2021 vidhan sabha election from Ballygunge.

Controversies
On 17 May 2021, Mukherjee, along with senior minister in the Mamata Banerjee cabinet Firad Hakim, MLA and former minister Madan Mitra and former Mayor of Kolkata Sovan Chatterjee were arrested by Central Bureau of Investigation in connection with the Narada sting operation.

Death
He was hospitalised in SSKM Hospital, Kolkata on 24 October 2021 with serious heart problems and died of a heart attack on 4 November 2021 at the age of 75. He was cremated with full state honors at Keoratola crematorium the following day.

References

1946 births
2021 deaths
State cabinet ministers of West Bengal
West Bengal MLAs 1996–2001
West Bengal MLAs 2001–2006
West Bengal MLAs 2011–2016
West Bengal MLAs 2016–2021
Trinamool Congress politicians from West Bengal
Politicians from Kolkata
Indian National Congress politicians from West Bengal
Bangabasi College alumni
West Bengal MLAs 2021–2026
West Bengal Legislative Assembly